Panjab Ali Biswas is a Bangladesh Awami League politician. He was elected a member of parliament from Pabna-4 in 1986.

Career 
Biswas was elected a member of parliament in 1986 from Pabna-4.

References 

Living people
People from Pabna District
Jatiya Samajtantrik Dal politicians
Awami League politicians
3rd Jatiya Sangsad members
Year of birth missing (living people)